Regimantas is a Lithuanian masculine given name. Individuals bearing the name Regimantas include:
Regimantas Adomaitis (born 1937), Lithuanian actor
Regimantas Miniotas (born 1996), Lithuanian basketball player

References

Masculine given names
Lithuanian masculine given names